The Port Stakes was a flat horse race in Great Britain open to four-year-olds. It was run on the Two Middle Miles (T.M.M.) of the Beacon course at Newmarket over a distance of 2 miles, and was scheduled to take place each year in early or mid April at the Craven meeting. The Two Middle Miles course was relatively flat and was considered less testing then the "Ditch-In" course, over which the similar Claret Stakes was run.

The race often attracted winners of the previous seasons British Classic Races: classic winners who went on to win the Port Stakes included Whisker, Prince Leopold, Mameluke, Green Mantle, Priam, Galata, Grey Momus, Ralph and Attila.

Winners 1815–1843

References

Flat races in Great Britain
Newmarket Racecourse
Recurring sporting events established in 1816
Discontinued horse races